Felix Antonio Santoni Rodriguez was a Puerto Rican politician and senator.

In 1917, Santoni was elected as a member of the first Puerto Rican Senate established by the Jones-Shafroth Act. He represented the Puerto Rico Senatorial district III (Arecibo).

In 1919, Santoni opposed voted against a bill to allow women voting. He claimed that "the time was not right for that reform".

References

1871 births
1959 deaths
Members of the Senate of Puerto Rico
People from Yauco, Puerto Rico